A holy city is a city of special significance to a religion.

Holy City may also refer to:

The Holy City (song)
Holy City, California
Holy City, Devon, a hamlet in England
Holy City Zoo, a former comedy club in San Francisco, California

See also 
Four Holy Cities, the cities of Jerusalem, Hebron, Safed and Tiberias in Jewish tradition
Holby City, a TV series